Intervida is a non-partisan, non-denominational and independent Spanish development NGO. The organization is based in Barcelona.

Mission 
Intervida works to contribute towards sustainable human development, providing the resources necessary so that the most disadvantaged populations can strengthen their capacities and create opportunities to improve their living conditions.

Action 
Intervida's efforts consist of long-term projects, awareness-raising activities and education for development in order to improve the living conditions of the most disadvantaged communities in a sustainable way.

Currently, Intervida is active in several countries in Latin America, Asia and Africa, offering its support to nearly five million people.

See also 
 International development

References

External links 
 Official Web

Development charities based in Spain